Dangroli may refer to:

 Dangroli, Berasia, a village in India
 Dangroli, Huzur, a village in India